John Mackie (3 January 1910 – 20 April 1980) was a Scottish professional footballer who played as a centre half.

Career
Born in Baillieston, Mackie played for Hull City, Bradford City and Chesterfield. For Bradford City, he made 91 appearances in the Football League; he also made 8 FA Cup appearances. For Chesterfield, he made 17 appearances in the Football League, and five appearances as a war guest.

Sources

References

1910 births
1980 deaths
People from Baillieston
Scottish footballers
Hull City A.F.C. players
Bradford City A.F.C. players
Chesterfield F.C. players
Chesterfield F.C. wartime guest players
English Football League players
Association football central defenders